The City of Temptation (German: Die Stadt der Versuchung) is a 1925 German silent drama film directed by Walter Niebuhr and starring Olga Tschechowa, Julanne Johnston and Adolf Klein.

Cast
 Olga Tschechowa 
 Julanne Johnston as Wanda Menkoff 
 Adolf Klein
 Hugh Miller
 Adolf E. Licho
 Hermann Picha
 Malcolm Tod as Harry Stephenson 
 Andja Zimowa

References

Bibliography
 Grange, William. Cultural Chronicle of the Weimar Republic. Scarecrow Press, 2008.

External links

1925 films
1925 drama films
German drama films
Films of the Weimar Republic
German silent feature films
German black-and-white films
Films based on British novels
Silent drama films
1920s German films